This is a list of Azerbaijan football transfers in the summer transfer window 2014 by club. Only clubs of the 2014–15 Azerbaijan Premier League are included.

Azerbaijan Premier League 2014-15

Araz-Naxçıvan

In:

Out:

AZAL

In:

Out:

Baku

In:

Out:

Gabala

In:

Out:

Inter Baku

In:

Out:

Khazar Lankaran

In:

Out:

Neftchi Baku

In:

Out:

Qarabağ

In:

Out:

Simurq

In:

Out:

Sumgayit

In:

Out:

References

Azerbaijan
Azerbaijani football transfer lists
2014–15 in Azerbaijani football